The 1960 All-Ireland Minor Football Championship was the 29th staging of the All-Ireland Minor Football Championship, the Gaelic Athletic Association's premier inter-county Gaelic football tournament for boys under the age of 18.

Dublin entered the championship as defending champions, however, they were defeated in the Leinster Championship.

On 25 September 1960, Galway won the championship following a 4-9 to 1-5 defeat of Cork in the All-Ireland final. This was their second All-Ireland title overall and their first title in eight championship season.

Results

Connacht Minor Football Championship

Quarter-Final

Galway 2-6 Mayo 0-4 Tuam.

Semi-Finals

Rosocmmon 5-9 Leitrim 2-5.

Galway 3-5 Sligo 0-7.

Final

Galway 4-11 Roscommon 0-3.

Leinster Minor Football Championship

Ulster Minor Football Championship

Munster Minor Football Championship

All-Ireland Minor Football Championship

Semi-Finals

Galway 2-12 Offaly 2-3 Croke Park.

Final

References

1960
All-Ireland Minor Football Championship